Stoke railway station was a station that served the village of Stoke-by-Clare in Suffolk, England.

The station and line closed in 1967 as part of the Beeching cuts.

References

External links
 Stoke station on navigable 1946 O. S. map
 

Disused railway stations in Suffolk
Former Great Eastern Railway stations
Railway stations in Great Britain opened in 1865
Railway stations in Great Britain closed in 1967
Beeching closures in England
South West Area, Ipswich